The following list includes all of the Canadian Register of Historic Places listings in Central Kootenay Regional District, British Columbia.

References 

(references appear in the table above as external links)

Central Kootenay Regional District